Papilio veiovis is a species of swallowtail butterfly from the genus Papilio that is found in Sulawesi.

References

veiovis
Butterflies described in 1865
Butterflies of Indonesia
Taxa named by William Chapman Hewitson